Askish (Asqış) is a rural locality (a village) in Baykibashevsky Selsoviet, Karaidelsky District, Bashkortostan, Russia. The population was 64 as of 2010. There is 1 street.

Geography 
Askish is located 38 km northwest of Karaidel (the district's administrative centre) by road. Kartkisyak is the nearest rural locality.

References 

Rural localities in Karaidelsky District